Reginald Thomas "Reg" Hope (12 June 1927 – 16 December 2010) was an Independent member of the Tamar and (from 1982) Meander divisions of the Tasmanian Legislative Council from 1979 to 1997.

Hope was born in Sheffield, Tasmania. He served as President of the Tasmanian Legislative Council from 1995 to 1997. The Reg Hope Foreshore Park in Devonport, Tasmania is named in his honour.

Hope died on 16 December 2010. At his death, Premier David Bartlett noted that he was "decent, honest, straightforward and committed to helping Tasmanians," while Don Wing said that he was "gregarious, passionate but above all a gentleman."

References

1927 births
2010 deaths
Independent members of the Parliament of Tasmania
Presidents of the Tasmanian Legislative Council
20th-century Australian politicians